Doorway or The Doorway may refer to:

Portals
 Door-shaped entrance
 Doorway page, a type of webpage
 Trapdoor

Geography
Doorway, Kentucky, a community in the United States

Arts, entertainment, and media

Music
Doorway, a 2007 album by Ron Block 
 "Doorway", a song by Planningtorock from the album W (Planningtorock album)
 "The Doorway", a song by Neurosis from the album Times of Grace

Other arts, entertainment, and media
 The Doorway (film), a 2000 Roger Corman film
"The Doorway" (Mad Men), the season six, 2-hour premiere episode of the television series Mad Men
Doorways, a proposed science-fiction series by George R.R. Martin